Caeathro is a village situated on the A4085 road between Caernarfon and Waunfawr in Gwynedd, northwest Wales. It is approximately 2 km from Caernarfon and 1.5 km from Waunfawr.

It is part of Waunfawr community. The population was 237 as of the 2011 census.

References

Villages in Gwynedd
Waunfawr